Andy Brick is an American composer, conductor and symphonist.

A native of suburban Chicago, Brick studied composition under Leslie Bassett at the University of Michigan. He then completed graduate studies in composition at the Mannes School of Music in Manhattan. In 1990 he arranged music for Sesame Street, and wrote scores for independent films. In 1996 he won a competition sponsored by the American Society of Composers, Authors and Publishers, which allowed him to score a film and record the composition with a live orchestra in Hollywood. Having previously worked primarily with synthesized music, Brick called this '"a defining moment".

 Andy Brick has composed and/or orchestrated music for game titles that include Maxis' Sim City: Rush Hour, Midway's Stranglehold, Electronic Arts' The Sims 2 and Warhammer Online: Age of Reckoning as well as Nintendo's Super Mario Bros., Bungie's Halo 3, and Square Enix's Final Fantasy series. His music has also been featured in such game titles as Arc the Lad by Working Designs, Shadoan by Interplay, The Far Reaches by 3DO, Tesselmania by MECC and others.

In August 2003 Brick conducted the Czech National Symphony Orchestra in the first Symphonic Game Music Concert outside Japan, at the Gewandhaus in Leipzig, Germany. Andy wrote the fanfare to this historic concert event where his music for Merregnon was featured. Andy Brick served as the exclusive principal conductor and music director of the concert series leading repeatedly sold-out performances from 2003–2007.

Brick has conducted over 70 game titles including Final Fantasy, Super Mario Bros., Legend of Zelda, Halo, and World of Warcraft with orchestras throughout the world including Prague Symphony Orchestra, Moravian Philharmonic, Bratislava Symphony, The Czech National Symphony, The North Carolina Symphony, The Eugene Symphony, The Filmharmonic of Prague and members of the New York Philharmonic and Detroit Symphony. His performances have been described as "Mesmerizing" leading to "Thunderous ovations generally reserved for Rock Stars." He has also worked in films for productions such as The Little Mermaid II: Return to the Sea and The Music Man.

Brick is a Distinguished Associate Professor and head of the Music and Technology department at Stevens Institute of Technology in Hoboken, New Jersey. He has also been the subject of feature stories on the CBS Evening News, and Billboard Magazine.

References

External links

 Andy Brick's official website
 Official Symphonic Game Music Concert website
 

American male conductors (music)
Video game composers
Year of birth missing (living people)
Living people
University of Michigan School of Music, Theatre & Dance alumni
21st-century American conductors (music)
21st-century American male musicians
Mannes School of Music alumni